Alapakkam also called  is a village in Cuddalore district in Tamil Nadu. It comes under Cuddalore taluk and Alappakkam and poovanikuppam village panchayat. It is located on highway NH 45A, en route to Chidambaram. It is 19 km from Cuddalore and 29 km from Chidambaram town. The village also houses an ancient Shiva temple. It has one middle school and one elementary school.the lake water finally connected to sangolikuppam river.alappkkam village located inside the keezhpoovanikuppam village panchayat.

References

External links 
 Government of Tamil Nadu
 village in wikimapia

Villages in Cuddalore district